El Reino Infantil is an Argentine YouTube channel featuring music for children owned by Leader Music. It was founded by Roberto Pumar in 2011.

As of 28 April 2021, the channel has over 55 million subscribers, being the 34th biggest YouTube channel in the world and the most subscribed Spanish-language YouTube channel after passing Badabun in August 2021. They are also the most subscribed in Argentina.

Series

María Elena Walsh 
María Elena Walsh was the first series created by El Reino Infantil, debuting in June 2011. The songs on this show were based in the stories and songs by the Argentine singer-songwriter, María Elena Walsh.  On the show, her songs are told by a pencil and a violin.

La Granja de Zenón 
The second series by El Reino Infantil was La Granja de Zenón, which also launched in June 2011.  La Granja de Zenón is about a farmer named Zenón, the owner of a farm with talking animals who are also Zenón's friends.  Some of these talking animals include, among others, El Gallo Bartolito (Bartolito the Rooster), La Vaca Lola (Lola the Cow), El Lorito Pepe (Pepe the Parrot), and El Caballo Percheron (Percherón the Horse).  Zenón also has one niece and two nephews, María, Juan Antonio, and Tito, who love to come to the farm to play. Zenón and his animal friends enjoy getting into interesting adventures on the farm.

As of April 9, 2022, La Granja de Zenón had 30.4 million subscribers and over 21.6 billion video views.

Of the many popular songs that originated from this show, La Vaca Lola (Song) and El Pollito Pío are the most famous.

Rondas y Clásicos Infantiles 
The third series, Rondas y Clásicos Infantiles, was released in April 2012.  On the show, two children named Santi and Viole go on many adventures with their eccentric grandfather, Captain Pipo.  Each of the main characters has the power to become anything, including sailors, farmers, witches, and others.

Canciones y Clásicos Infantiles 
This series, released in July 2012, features songs that did not make it into the other series.

In popular culture 
On July 8, 2019, Ashton Kutcher published a video on his Instagram page of he and wife Mila Kunis singing "La Vaca Lola" (Lola the Cow), a song made famous on La Granja de Zenón.

The singer who provided the original vocals to La Vaca Lola is Argentine singer-songwriter Cam Beszkin although she is not credited.

References

External links 
 Official website
 El Reino Infantil (channel) on YouTube

Children's mass media
YouTube channels launched in 2011
Education-related YouTube channels